James Duke may refer to:

 James Buchanan Duke (1856–1925), American tobacco and electric power magnate
SS James B. Duke a Liberty ship
 James A. Duke (1929–2017), ethnobotanist
 Sir James Duke, 1st Baronet (1782–1873), British Member of Parliament
 Sir James Duke, 2nd Baronet, of the Duke baronets
 James "Red" Duke (1928–2015), Houston, Texas, doctor
 James Duke (footballer), Scottish footballer

See also 
 Jamie Dukes (born 1964), former American football player